Serious Eats is a website and blog focused on food enthusiasts, created by food critic and author Ed Levine. A Serious Eats book was published by Levine in 2011. Serious Eats was acquired by Fexy Media in 2015 and then by Dotdash in late 2020.

Content 
The site consists of general food features as well as recipes and home cooking advice.

The site is notable for launching the career of J. Kenji Lopez-Alt, whose column "The Food Lab" was adapted into a James Beard award-winning cookbook of the same name. Lopez-Alt's writing was highly regarded among amateur cooks for its rigorous approach to cooking and recreating cultural food icons, such as the ShackBurger and Chick-fil-a, in the home kitchen.

Critical reception
In 2008, Serious Eats was ranked #17 on Time magazine's list of the 50 Best Websites. Serious Eats was the recipient of two James Beard Foundation awards in 2010 for Best Food Blog and Best Video Webcast.

See also
 List of websites about food and drink
 The Food Lab, a cookbook written by Serious Eats columnist J. Kenji López–Alt

References 

American cooking websites

External links